Alderton is an English locational name from any of the various places so called, although they do not share the same derivations.

Notable people with the surname include:
Charles Alderton, the creator of Dr Pepper soft drink
David Alderton (born 1956), English writer
Dolly Alderton, British writer
Gene Alderton (1934–1992), American football player
Jimmy Alderton (born 1924), English footballer
John Alderton (born 1940), English actor
John Alderton (American football) (born 1931), American football player
Rio Alderton (born 1982), English footballer
Terry Alderton (born 1970), English comedian

English toponymic surnames